Edward Fleetford Sise (1877 - 1943) Canadian business man, First President of Northern Electric Company (now called Nortel) 1914 - 1919).

See also
 Charles Fleetford Sise Sr.
 Charles Fleetford Sise Jr.
 Paul Fleetford Sise

References

External links
 The Sise Family and the Bell Telephone Company of Canada

1877 births
1943 deaths
Nortel people